South Mound is an unincorporated community in Neosho County, Kansas, United States.  As of the 2020 census, the population of the community and nearby areas was 27.

History
South Mound was located on the Missouri–Kansas–Texas Railroad.  The railroad tracks were removed in 1989 following the M-K-T's merger with Missouri Pacific.

A post office was opened in South Mound in 1872, and remained in operation until it was discontinued in 1971.

Demographics

For statistical purposes, the United States Census Bureau has defined this community as a census-designated place (CDP).

References

Further reading

External links
 Neosho County maps: Current, Historic, KDOT

Unincorporated communities in Neosho County, Kansas
Unincorporated communities in Kansas